Hostile Ambient Takeover is the fourteenth studio album by the Melvins, released in 2002 through Ipecac Recordings.

Each song was released as a limited 7" vinyl single (limited to 2,500 copies each) that included exclusive B-sides, which are mostly covers (except for "The Anti-Vermin Seed" which was split up onto both sides of its single).

Track listing
All songs written by Buzz Osborne except where noted.

Singles

Vol. 1

Vol. 2

Vol. 3

Vol. 4

Vol. 5

Vol. 6

Vol. 7

Personnel
Dale Crover – drums, vocals, keyboards
Kevin "Rutmanis" – bass, slide bass
King Buzzo – vocals, guitar
with
Sir David Scott Stone – thunder sheet, electric wire
Adam Jones – virus

Additional personnel
Toshi Kasai – engineer, mixing, keyboards
John Golden – mastering
Mackie Osborne – art direction & design
Kevin Willis – photography

References

Ipecac Recordings albums
Melvins albums
2002 albums